Redd is a Turkish rock band established in 1996 by tenor opera singer Doğan Duru and guitarist Berke Hatipoğlu under the name Ten. They used to play at bars until they set up their own studio in 2004. Their first album, titled "50/50", produced by Levent Büyük, was published a year later by Stardium Müzik, already under the name Redd. The first music video was shot for "Mutlu Olmak İçin" (To Be Happy). Their second studio album, "Kirli Suyunda Parıltılar" (Glitters on Dirty Water), came out in 2006 under the label Pasaj Müzik. Their song "Falan Filan" entered the MTV World Music Charts at the 10th position. In 2007 the band produced their third album, "Plastik Çiçekler ve Böcek" (Plastic Flowers and Beetle). Redd started the studio recordings of their fourth album in 2009, published by Sony Music. Their first original soundtrack album for director Çağan Irmak's feature film Prensesin Uykusu was released in 2010. Songs from this album managed to enter the European music charts. Their last album, "Mükemmel Boşluk" was published in 2016 under the Pasaj label.

Foundation 
Redd started working as a band in September 1996. Doğan Duru and Güneş Duru decided to make some changes in their group Invictus Band. Doğan invited Berke Hatipoğlu to their group, and then İlke Hatipoğlu also joined. After playing as Invictus Band for more than a year, the group decided to carry on performing under the name of "Ten".

Ten changed itself to Redd a bit later, and the band started to perform rock music in English especially in Istanbul. They started to write some of their own songs while they were performing, and in 2003 they moved their recording activities to record studios.

The band decided to find their own studio because of the rental studios difficulties and wrote many songs in one year.

Social Works

Rock for Van 

A major earthquake occurred in Van on 24 October 2011. To support the people who lost their homes, Güneş Duru called various artists on Twitter to organize a charity concert. More than 15,000 tickets were sold and a school was built with the money raised by the concert.

Memorial Concert for Hrant Dink 

To remember Hrant Dink, who was the main editor of Agos Newspaper and had been brutally assassinated on 19 January 2007, Redd organized a special concert in Ghetto, exactly five years after his death. Gripin, Kardeş Türküler, Jehan Barbur, Moğollar, Mor ve Ötesi, Aylin Aslım, Şevval Sam and Rojin performed in this concert. The money from this concert was donated to Hrant Dink Foundation. Redd also wrote "Özgürlük Sırtından Vurulmuş" ( Freedom was backstabbed) in their album "21" for Hrant Dink.

Ahmet Şık and Nedim Şener 

Bon Jovi came to Istanbul during their 2011 Europe tour and Redd performed as the opening group for them. In the concert, Redd sang "Masal" (fairytale) for Ahmet Şık and Nedim Şener, who were unjustly in prison for 127 days .

Discography
 2005: 50/50 (Stardium)
 2006: Kirli Suyunda Parıltılar  (Pasaj)
 2008: Gecenin Fişi Yok DVD (Pasaj)
 2008: Plastik Çiçekler ve Böcek (Pasaj)
 2009: 21  (Sony Music)
 2010: Prensesin Uykusu  (Most Production - İmaj)
 2012: Hayat Kaçık Bir Uykudur (Pasaj)
 2016: Mükemmel Boşluk (Pasaj)
 2019: Yersiz Göksüz Zamanlar (Pasaj)

Music videos

References

Sources
 Redd Biography

External links
 Official website 

Turkish rock music groups
1996 establishments in Turkey
Musical groups established in 1996
Musical groups from Istanbul